Cornelius White (10 March 1901 – 1975) was an English professional footballer who played as a centre forward.

Career
Born in Leicester, White spent his early career with Whitwick Imperial, Birmingham, Oldham Athletic, Llandudno and Bangor City. White signed for Bradford City from Bangor City in June 1928, and scored 4 goals in 4 league appearances for the club, before moving to Hereford United in June 1929. He later played for Loughborough Corinthians and Nuneaton Town.

Sources

References

1901 births
1975 deaths
Date of death missing
English footballers
Birmingham City F.C. players
Oldham Athletic A.F.C. players
Llandudno F.C. players
Bangor City F.C. players
Bradford City A.F.C. players
Hereford United F.C. players
Loughborough Corinthians F.C. players
Nuneaton Borough F.C. players
English Football League players
Association football forwards